The Austria men's national under-19 volleyball team represents Austria in international men's volleyball competitions and friendly matches under the age 19 and it is ruled by the Austrian Volleyball Federation body that is an affiliate of the Federation of International Volleyball FIVB and also part of the European Volleyball Confederation CEV.

Results

Summer Youth Olympics
 Champions   Runners up   Third place   Fourth place

FIVB U19 World Championship
 Champions   Runners up   Third place   Fourth place

Europe U19 / U18 Championship
 Champions   Runners up   Third place   Fourth place

Team

Current squad
The following players are the Austrian players that have competed in the 2018 Boys' U18 Volleyball European Championship

References

External links
  Volleyball Association of Austria 

National men's under-19 volleyball teams
Volleyball
Volleyball in Austria